The 1893 Nebraska Bugeaters football team represented the University of Nebraska in the 1893 college football season. The team was coached by first-year head coach Frank Crawford, and played their home games at Lincoln Park, in Lincoln, Nebraska.

Prior to the 1893 season, NU hired an official head coach for the first time in program history. Frank Crawford, also the first head coach of Michigan's football program, was compensated with a $500 stipend plus tuition to the university. Nebraska also began charging a 25-cent admission fee to attend games played at Lincoln Park.

Schedule

Coaching staff

Roster

Starters

Game summaries

Doane

After no game between the two schools in 1892, Nebraska and Doane met in 1893 at Lincoln Park. Nebraska dominated the game, shutting out Doane, including a goal-line stand from the two-yard line that was followed by a lengthy NU touchdown drive. Doane, down by 28 late in the second half, ultimately forfeited the rest of the game.

Nebraska's first mascot, a white bull terrier painted red on one side, made its first appearance at this game.

Baker

According to the custom of the time, each team selected one of the two members of the officiating crew, and Baker's selection was a member of their own team. Baker's official reportedly made a number of calls or non-calls that prompted anger from the Bugeaters, who quickly fell behind 6–0. Ten unanswered points gave Nebraska a 10–6 lead until a late Baker touchdown tied the game, and the game ended 10–10. This was the only game ever played between Baker and Nebraska.

at Denver Athletic Club

Nebraska's rematch with the Denver Athletic Club was a highly physical game, with reports of slugging, kicking, and at least one player temporarily knocked unconscious. Animosity ran high, reportedly nearing a riot by halftime. There were still ten minutes left to play in the second half of a tied game when the Denver AC squad was called for a slugging foul, turning the ball over to the Bugeaters. The Denver AC team walked off the field and, after an extended debate, refused to finish the game. This resulted in a forfeit, and the official score was recorded as a 1–0 Nebraska win.

Missouri

Before Nebraska's first conference game of the season, the team was delayed arriving in Kansas City until very early on the morning of the game. Missouri took advantage of the weary Bugeaters, outsscoring NU 18–6 in the second half to win the game 30–18.

University of Missouri records list the final score as an 18–12 Missouri victory.

Kansas

Nebraska's attempts to even the series with Kansas were quickly dashed. The Jayhawks scored all 18 of the game's points, including a bizarre play in which a Kansas punt was fumbled by Nebraska and recovered by Kansas, whose players subsequently fumbled and recovered the ball twice before running it in for a touchdown.

Iowa

Iowa met Nebraska to close out league play in blizzard conditions. The game was punctuated by the appearance of Bugeater head coach Frank Crawford in the lineup, playing off the right half and kicking field goals (this practice was not uncommon at the time). Nebraska held on for a 20–18 win, resulting in a third-place WIUFA finish between Nebraska and Iowa.

University of Iowa records suggest this game was played on November 23, 1893.

References

Nebraska
Nebraska Cornhuskers football seasons
Nebraska Bugeaters football